Burke Henry (born January 21, 1979) is a Canadian former professional ice hockey defenceman who played 39 games in the National Hockey League for the Chicago Blackhawks. He played several seasons throughout Europe. He last played with Nikko Icebucks of the Asia League Ice Hockey. He then spent 2014-2017 Coaching the Icebucks in Japan.

In the hockey season of 2017–18, he coached for the RHA Nationals Elite Academy. In 2018, he moved to Miami Beach, Florida and became part of an elite real estate group.  He is an expert in commercial real estate and finance. He is a licensed Mortgage broker. He lives in the city of Boca Raton with his wife, Vanessa Sidi.

Playing career
Henry was drafted 73rd overall by the New York Rangers in the 1997 NHL Entry Draft He played two years with the American Hockey League's Hartford Wolf Pack, winning the Calder Cup in 2000. He was traded to the Calgary Flames in 2001. He was injured in training camp, with a broken ankle. He was then sent to AHL with the Saint John Flames.  In 2002, he signed with the Chicago Blackhawks where he played in NHL. Over two seasons, Henry played 39 regular season games for Chicago, scoring 2 goals and 6 assists for 8 points, collecting 33 penalty minutes.

After spells in the AHL for the San Antonio Rampage and the Milwaukee Admirals during the lockout, Henry moved to Europe in 2005, joining EC Red Bull Salzburg of the Austrian Hockey League.  In 2006, Henry moved to Finland's SM-liiga and played for Tappara.  Henry moved to Sweden's Elitserien in 2007 for Linköpings HC but left the team mid-season and joined Danish team AaB Ishockey based in Aalborg.

Career statistics

Awards and achievements
 Named to the WHL East First All-Star Team in 1998
 Named to the WHL East Second All-Star Team in 1999

References

External links
 

1979 births
Living people
AaB Ishockey players
Brandon Wheat Kings players
Canadian ice hockey defencemen
Chicago Blackhawks players
EC Red Bull Salzburg players
Flint Generals players
Hartford Wolf Pack players
HDD Olimpija Ljubljana players
Ice hockey people from Manitoba
Linköping HC players
Milwaukee Admirals players
Nikkō Ice Bucks players
New York Rangers draft picks
Norfolk Admirals players
Orli Znojmo players
Saint John Flames players
San Antonio Rampage players
Tappara players
Canadian expatriate ice hockey players in the Czech Republic
Canadian expatriate ice hockey players in Austria
Canadian expatriate ice hockey players in Slovenia
Canadian expatriate ice hockey players in Denmark
Canadian expatriate ice hockey players in Finland
Canadian expatriate ice hockey players in Sweden
Canadian expatriate ice hockey players in the United States
Canadian expatriate ice hockey players in Japan